Marquis Alexandre de Prouville de Tracy (c. 1596 or 1603 – 1670) was a French aristocrat, statesman, and military leader. He was the seigneur of Tracy-le-Val and Tracy-le-Mont (Picardy).

Life

The Marquis de Tracy first made his name as a regimental commander in Germany in the 1640s, then was appointed Commissary-General of the French troops serving in Germany. In 1647 he represented France at the Ulm negotiations with Sweden and Bavaria.

In 1664 a fleet under the Marquis de Tracy carried a force of soldiers and colonists led by Antoine Lefèbvre de La Barre of the newly formed Compagnie de la France équinoxiale to Cayenne.
They left the port of La Rochelle, France, on 26 February 1664 with two warships and 400 soldiers.
The expedition included 1,200 settlers.
They arrived in Cayenne on 11 May 1664.
On 15 May 1664 the Dutch general Guerin Spranger agreed to capitulate.

The Marquis de Tracy was then appointed lieutenant-général of New France. The governor was not present, so de Tracy acted as the governor in the Sovereign Council. From his base in Quebec City, he led the Carignan-Salières Regiment in a campaign against the Iroquois peoples.  After defeating them and destroying their crops and villages, he launched an attack against the Mohawk nation and caused destruction to their territory in central present-day New York. Marquis Alexandre de Prouville de Tracy seized all the Mohawk lands in the name of the king of France. He forced the Mohawk to accept the Roman Catholic faith and to adopt the French language as taught by the Jesuit missionaries. A mission village for Mohawk Catholics, Kahnawake, was set up south of Montreal.

Marquis Alexandre de Prouville de Tracy died in Paris in the parish of Saint-Eustache on 28 April 1670.

Legacy

The Tracy Squadron of cadets at the Royal Military College Saint-Jean was named in his honour.

See also

 Vincent Basset Du Tartre (surgeon major)
 Pierre de Saurel
 Alexandre Berthier

Notes

Sources

External links

 
Histoire de Sorel-Tracy''

Year of birth uncertain
1670 deaths
French marquesses
People of New France
Governors general of the French Antilles